Richard Bruce may refer to:

 Richard Bruce Nugent (1906–1987), also Richard Bruce, writer and painter in the Harlem Renaissance
 Richard Isaac Bruce (1840–1926), English colonial officer and administrator
 Richard Bruce, pseudonym used by Robert Bache Smith (1875–1951), American librettist and lyricist
 Richard Bruce, or The Life That Now Is (1891) a work by the Christian preacher, Charles Sheldon

See also
 Richard Francis-Bruce (born 1948), Australian film editor